The Curtains is an American band founded by Chris Cohen and visual artist Trevor Shimizu in San Francisco, California in 2000.

Style
Their first three albums are mostly instrumental music which uses electric guitar, Moog Concertmate MG-1 and drums.

Initially influenced by film soundtracks, TV jingles, West Coast jazz, and early electronic music, The Curtains have slowly gravitated towards melodic vocal-based pop music.

History
Since 2002, The Curtains have released four full-length albums, one split CD, and several 7-inches on various labels, including a limited-edition lathe cut. The band's lineup changes often, with principal songwriter Chris Cohen being the only continuous member.

The Curtains toured the Western U.S. with Maher Shalal Hash Baz in 2004 and recorded as members of that band on the record Faux Depart. They have also opened for such bands as Red Krayola, Saccharine Trust, Young People, Joan of Arc, Glass Candy, The Dead C, Burning Star Core, Open City, Final Fantasy, and Beirut.

Discography

Albums
 Hit Car Tunes (2001)
 Fast Talks (Thin Wrist, 2002)
 Flybys (Thin Wrist, 2003)
 Make Us Two Crayons on the Floor (Yik Yak, 2004) split with Maher Shalal Hash Baz 
 Vehicles of Travel (Frenetic, 2004)
 Calamity (Asthmatic Kitty, 2006)

Singles
 "Athletes in the Stars" b/w "Watch for the Eliminator" (Snowy Visitor, 2000)
 "Airplane Dives" b/w "Strive, Lifeforms, Strive" (Collective Jyrk, 2004) split with Ghost to Falco
 "Go Lucky" b/w "World's Most Dangerous Woman" (Tomlab, 2006)

References

External links
 The Curtains
 Asthmatic Kitty
 Thin Wrist

American pop music groups
Asthmatic Kitty artists